Lai in Iran may refer to:
 Lai Molla Kheyl
 Lai-ye Pasand
 Lai-ye Rudbar